Ori Shitrit, born January 21, 1986) is a retired Israeli footballer. At international level, Shitrit was capped at levels from under-17 to under-21.

Honours
Toto Cup:
2008–09

References

1986 births
Living people
Israeli Jews
Israeli footballers
Association football defenders
Maccabi Tel Aviv F.C. players
Hapoel Ironi Kiryat Shmona F.C. players
Bnei Sakhnin F.C. players
Maccabi Netanya F.C. players
Hapoel Nir Ramat HaSharon F.C. players
Hapoel Kfar Saba F.C. players
Israeli Premier League players